The University of Rizal System (URS) is a network of colleges located in the Rizal province, Philippines. It operates multiple campuses, with the main campus being in Tanay, Rizal.

It is committed to produce graduates in agriculture, engineering, science and technology, culture and arts, teacher and business education through instruction, research, extension and production services in Region IV.

The university  has expanded from its Main campus in Tanay to offer programs to students in the campuses: Angono, Antipolo, Binangonan, Cainta, Cardona, Morong, Pililla, Rodriguez, Tanay, and Taytay.

History

The Rizal State College was established by Republic Act Number 1560 in 1956 as Rizal National Agricultural School (RNAS). It was chartered as a state college on June 24, 1983, by Batas Pambansa Bilang 662 known as Rizal College of Agriculture and Technology (RCAT). It was later named Rizal State College (RSC) making it the first state college of the Province of Rizal. The college is about 67 kilometers from Metro Manila and accessible to towns of Rizal through Manila East Road through the newly opened sea level in the Sierra Madre Mountain range and is overlooking the Laguna Lake and the surrounding lake towns. The college has five extension campuses located in four of the thirteen towns of Rizal namely: Pililla, Rodriguez, Angono, Binangonan, and in the lone City of Antipolo which were established in 1991, 1995, 1996 and 2000, respectively.

The Rizal Polytechnic College (formerly Rizal Technological and Polytechnic Institute or RTPI) was established as a provincial high school in 1944. It is located in the heart of the town of Morong. By virtue of Batas Pambansa Bilang 469, the school was converted into a tertiary institution and on March 1, 1995, Republic Act Number 7933 converted RTPI into a state college known as Rizal Polytechnic College (RPC). The college has an extension campus in Cainta which was opened in 1999.

With the passage of Republic Act Number 9157 in June 2001 which lapsed into law on August 11, 2001, the University of Rizal System (URS) was established by integrating the Rizal State College, Rizal Polytechnic College and Rizal Technological University - Antipolo Annex.

Organization and administration
The Board of Regents is the highest decision-making body of the University of Rizal System. It is composed of 12 members.

References
http://www.chanrobles.com/republicactno9157.html
http://www.urs.edu.ph
Republic Act No. 9157 | Official Gazette of the Republic of the Philippines

External links

Official website
President's Blog

Universities and colleges in Rizal
State universities and colleges in the Philippines